Khelat 1839 is a battle honour of the British Army and the British Indian Army awarded for a campaign on the North West Frontier during the nineteenth century.

The fortress of Khelat, held by a Baluchi tribal chief, threatened communications with India through the Bolan Pass. The unfriendly Baluchi tribes had harassed and attacked British convoys and killed officers and camp followers alike during the First Anglo-Afghan War. As retaliation, the Bombay Column stormed the fortress on 13 November 1839 on its way back to India.

Battle honour
The honour was awarded vide GOGG dated 15 February 1840 and Bombay Government Order No 474 of 1841 and the spelling changed from 'Kelat' vide Gazette of India No 1079 of 1910. A non-repugnant honour, it was awarded to the following units:
 4th Bengal Irregular Cavalry (now 1st Horse)
 Bombay Sappers & Miners (now the Bombay Engineer Group)
 31st Bengal Infantry - later 1st Battalion, the Rajput Regiment, now the 4th Battalion, the Brigade of Guards)

Battle honours of the British Army
Battle honours of the Indian Army
Military of British India
Battle honours of the Bombay Sappers
History of the Bombay Sappers
History of the Corps of Engineers (Indian Army)